John Henry Whitehead  is a New Zealand economist. He served as Secretary of the Treasury between April 2003 and May 2011. He has been chancellor and board chair of St John New Zealand since June 2020.

Early career
Whitehead graduated in 1970 with a Bachelor of Science with Honours degree in Mathematics and later completed a Master of Commerce with First Class Honours in Economics in 1975, both from the University of Canterbury. Before joining Treasury, Whitehead worked in the Statistics Department and was Deputy Director of the Labour Party Research Unit (1977–82).

Treasury
Whitehead joined Treasury in 1982, subsequently filling positions as Director of Macroeconomic Policy and Director of Tax Policy and International Economics. He was appointed Deputy Secretary and Branch Manager of Corporate Services in 1996.

Between 1985 and 1992, he worked as an Economic Adviser in the Prime Minister's Office and David Lange's government (1985–88), and as a Minister (Economic) at the New Zealand High Commission in London. After acting in the role, Whitehead was appointed as Treasury Secretary and chief executive on 8 April 2003 and served in that role until 31 May 2011.

In the 2011 Queen's Birthday Honours, Whitehead was appointed a Companion of the New Zealand Order of Merit, for services as Secretary to the Treasury.

World Bank
Whitehead was a World Bank Executive Director from August 2011 to July 2013 for Australia, Cambodia, Kiribati, Republic of Korea, Marshall Islands, Federated States of Micronesia, Mongolia, New Zealand, Palau, Papua New Guinea, Samoa, Solomon Islands, Tuvalu and Vanuatu.

St John New Zealand

In 2016, Whitehead was appointed to the board of St John New Zealand. In March 2019, he was made an Officer of the Order of St John, and in February 2020 he was promoted to Knight of the Order of St John. He was appointed chancellor and chair of the national priory board of St John New Zealand for a three-year term from 24 June 2020.

References

Companions of the New Zealand Order of Merit
Living people
New Zealand economists
New Zealand public servants
University of Canterbury alumni
20th-century New Zealand public servants
Year of birth missing (living people)
World Bank people
Knights of the Order of St John